Yang Chia-yun (Karen Yang), born March 1947 and originally from Qingdao, Shandong Province, is one of the second generation directors in Taiwan. She is also regarded as a "pioneer female film director of commercial Taiwanese film during the 1970s and 1980s". In 1998, Yang Chia-yun directed the documentary A Secret Buries For 50 Years-- A Story of Taiwanese "Comfort Women", which won the 35th Golden Horse Awards for "Best documentary". "The fate and resistance of women are mostly the focus of Chia-yun Yang's movies", among which The Unsinkable Miss Calabash and A Secret Buried For 50 Years-- A Story of Taiwanese "Comfort Women" are the ones that she is personally most satisfied with.

Biography

Early years 
Yang Chia-yun's interest in and preference for movies had been cultivated since she was a child. At that time, her elder brother often liked to make use of existing simple props, such as curtains, table lamps, homemade paper puppets and so forth, to create a "family shadow play". Even if the props were simple and the techniques were not mature enough, this game was quite interesting for Yang Chia-yun at a young age. After graduating from high school, Yang Chia-yun went to the National Taiwan Art Academy (now the Taiwan Art University) to study in the department of movie and TV program. During that time, she experienced the work of a continuity clerk for the first time in the summer internship. Later, she was assigned by the Central Motion Picture Corporation (now the Central Pictures Corporation) to work as an intern in director Hsing Lee's movie Jade Goddess, during which time she was promoted by Yung-Tze Li, the continuity clerk of the movie, and became a formal continuity girl.
In the first nine years of Yang Chia-yun's career, she once served as a continuity clerk, an assistant director and a deputy director and acquired technical skills such as cutting, dubbing and so forth. She also followed and cooperated with senior directors Hsing Lee, Ching-Jui Pai and Yao-Chi Chen in the early period. Therefore, she had accumulated rich experience in practice. In the 1970s, Yang Chia-yun also worked as a writer and co-wrote the scripts of the movies such as The Three Tales, A Saturday Date, The Beauty with Two Faces and others.

After becoming a movie director 
In 1978, after entering the movie industry for nine years, Yang became a director officially and directed her first film, an affectionate literary film Morning Mist, with Brigitte Lin and Chin Han playing the lead roles. Later, Yang and the female writer Hsuan Hsiao-fa together set up Sunshine Film Company and their first movie was a comedy, The Unsinkable Miss Calabash in 1981. In fact, they originally planned to produce another movie as the first one of the company. However, the comedy movies were popular at that time, so they changed their plan. Encouraged by the news agency of the executive council, The Unsinkable Miss Calabash was sent to show in the Edinburgh International Film Festival. This movie also got three nominations in the 18th Golden Horse Awards, best actress and best film original music, and Wang Lai, supporting actress of the movie, won the golden horse award of the best supporting actress. Yang Chia-yun also tried to direct the works of other subjects, such as a thriller Who Dare Challenge Me in 1981 and a horror movie Exposed to Danger in 1982.
In 1998, Yang Chia-yun directed the documentary A Secret Buries For 50 Years-- A Story of Taiwanese "Comfort Women", which was in the shortlist of Japanese Yamagata International Documentary Film Festival, and won the 35th golden horse award for "Best documentary". After directing A Secret Buried For 50 Years-- A Story of Taiwanese "Comfort Women", "Yang Chia-yun stopped directing drama movies and made only advertisements, social education films and public welfare films".

Other works 
In addition to making films, Yang Chia-yun also participated in the direct of television series for China Television Company, Ltd. (CTV), and Chinese Television Service (CTS, now the Chinese Television System Enterprise), such as Mo Ran Hui Shou (in 1984), Mo Gui Shu (in 1985), Sunny Rain (in 1990), Jin Se Shi Guang (in 1991), Jin Qian Shu. Moreover, she also participated in making a TV program: Yin fa shou nian : Sun Yue he ta de lao peng you men. "The same team worked for A Secret Buries For 50 Years-- A Story of Taiwanese "Comfort Women" parptcipated in making this program, including director Yang Chia-yun, producer Nianci Wang, photography Ruiyuan Shen, and WorldCat Identities". What's more, Yang Chia-yun worked for Hsing Lee's stage play Xia Xue.

Filmography

Movies

Television series

Scripts

Others

References

External links 

Chia-Yun Yang on douban.com

1947 births
Taiwanese women film directors
Living people
Artists from Qingdao
Taiwanese people from Shandong
Film directors from Shandong
Taiwanese documentary film directors
Women documentary filmmakers